The ninth season of 7th Heaven—an American family-drama television series, created and produced by Brenda Hampton—premiered on September 13, 2004, on The WB, and concluded on May 23, 2005 (22 episodes).

Cast and characters

Main 
Stephen Collins as Eric Camden
Catherine Hicks as Annie Camden
Beverley Mitchell as Lucy Camden-Kinkirk
Mackenzie Rosman as Ruthie Camden
Nikolas and Lorenzo Brino as Sam and David Camden
George Stults as Kevin Kinkirk
Tyler Hoechlin as Martin Brewer
Happy as Happy the Dog

Partial Main/Recurring
David Gallagher as Simon Camden (14 episodes)
Barry Watson as Matt Camden (10 episodes)

Episodes

References

2004 American television seasons
2005 American television seasons